Jaime Ucar (born 24 September 1915, date of death unknown) was a Uruguayan fencer. He competed in the individual and team foil events at the 1948 Summer Olympics.

References

External links
 

1915 births
Year of death missing
Sportspeople from Montevideo
Uruguayan male foil fencers
Olympic fencers of Uruguay
Fencers at the 1948 Summer Olympics
20th-century Uruguayan people